St. Xavier's College for Women, Aluva, is a women's degree college located in Aluva, Kerala. It was established in the year 1964. The college is affiliated with Mahatma Gandhi University. This college offers courses in arts, commerce and science.

Departments

Science
Physics
Chemistry
Mathematics
Botany
Statistics
Zoology
Microbiology
Biochemistry

Arts and Commerce
Malayalam
English
Hindi
Sanskrit
Political Science
Economics
Physical Education
Commerce

Accreditation 
The college is  recognized by the University Grants Commission (UGC).

Notable alumni
 Ananya (actress), Malayalam movie actress.
 Honey Rose, Malayalam movie actress.
 M. C. Josephine, Indian politician

References

External links

Universities and colleges in Kochi
Educational institutions established in 1964
1964 establishments in Kerala
Arts and Science colleges in Kerala
Colleges affiliated to Mahatma Gandhi University, Kerala
Aluva
Women's universities and colleges in Kerala